Morning dew may refer to:

 Dew

Music
 "Morning Dew", a song written by Bonnie Dobson that has been covered by multiple musical artists
 "Morning Dew", a song from the album "Day and Night" by Schiller (band)
 "Achim Isul", a 1970s Korean protest song in the Norae Undong style by Kim Min-ki, eventually banned in Korea
 "Morning Dew", a 1960s band formed by Mal Robinson, Blair Honeyman, Don Sligar and Don Anderson
 "Morning Dew", a Bad Lip Reading parody of Jay-Z, Bruno Mars, and Lady Gaga, found on YouTube
 Morning Dew (shipwreck), a pleasurecraft which sank, on March 17, 1998 -- see USCGC Yellowfin (WPB-87319)